Ellen Clementine Howarth (born Ellen Clementine Doran in Cooperstown, New York, May 17, 1827, died Trenton, New Jersey, December 23, 1899), was an American poet.

The daughter of a calico printer, and employed as a factory worker at the age of seven, she married Joseph Howarth, in the same occupation. She lived at Trenton, New Jersey in extremely reduced circumstances until friends secured her a comfortable subsistence. She authored a volume of poems in 1864, The Wind-Harp and Other Poems, and also wrote words for the song "'Tis but a Little Faded Flower".  Her later work, Poems (1867), was edited by Richard Watson Gilder.

Howarth said her poems came to her as she did housework, and she only wrote them down when she considered them finished. They were initially published in newspapers in Trenton under the pen name "Clementine", and then in magazines; Richard Gilder helped her find markets for them. She wrote many poems in a few years, and then mostly ceased writing.

Notes

References
 Ellen Mackay Hutchinson and Arthur Stedman, A Library of American Literature from the Earliest Settlement to the Present (1892), v. 11, p. 531.

External links

 WorldCat page on Ellen Clementine Howarth

American women poets
Writers from New York (state)
Writers from Trenton, New Jersey
1827 births
1899 deaths
19th-century American poets
19th-century American women writers